Phi Alpha Epsilon is an academic, discipline-specific honor society for architectural engineering in the United States.  The honor society was founded at Kansas State University in the fall of 1980 by Prof. Charles R. Bissey, P.E. (January 9, 1934 - November 18, 2006).

Membership Qualifications
Some qualifications include:

 Must be seeking a degree in architectural engineering
 Must have completed a certain number of courses toward the degree
 Must have a minimum grade point average
 Must be in the top quarter of the Junior class, or top third of the Senior class

Chapters

One of these is/was at the (University of Miami), noted in several issues of its Fact Book.

See also
 Tau Beta Pi - The honor society for all engineering disciplines
 Honor society
 Association of College Honor Societies (ACHS)

References

Engineering honor societies
Student organizations established in 1980
1980 establishments in Kansas